The Sony Ericsson W580i is a mid range slider style mobile phone in the Walkman series. The phone was announced on 26 March 2007 and was released in early August. It is a 2.5G Quad-band (850/900/1800/1900) GSM phone with EDGE capabilities and has a 2 megapixel camera.  It comes in "Style White", "Boulevard Black", "Metro Pink", "Urban Grey", "Jungle Green" and "Velvet Red".

The phone made an appearance in Ciara and 50 Cent's music video, "Can't Leave 'Em Alone". It was also shown in the films You Don't Mess with the Zohan and Paul Blart: Mall Cop. The phone contains the ability to detect motion on a limited scale.  For instance, the phone keeps track of how many steps the user has taken. The W580i has a special feature, Shake Control, which also makes use of motion sensing. When listening to music in the Walkman feature, depressing the Walkman button and subsequently shaking the phone will select a song at random.

The W580i is the predecessor to the Sony Ericsson W595, and related, non-Walkman equivalent is Sony Ericsson S500.

Specifications

Design
Colours: Style White, Metro Pink, Boulevard Black, Urban Grey, Jungle Green, Velvet Red, and Jazzy Purple
Navigation key
Picture wallpaper
Wallpaper animation
Size
99 × 47 × 14 mm
3.9 × 1.8 × 0.5 inches
Weight
94 g
3.3 oz
Screen
262,144 color TFT LCD
240x320 pixels

Entertainment
3D games
Java
FM radio with search function and RDS
Video streaming
Video play
Music
Bluetooth stereo (A2DP)
Mega Bass
PlayNow
Shake control
Supports music file formats MP3, AAC
TrackID
Camera
2.0 megapixel
Digital zoom 2.5× (Only available in VGA 640x480)
Digital zoom 4× (Only available in video recording)
Picture blogging
Video recording

Communication
Polyphonic ringtones
Speakerphone
Vibrating alert
Mp3 ring tones

Connectivity
Bluetooth technology
Modem
PictBridge
Synchronization PC
USB mass storage
Bluetooth 2.0 support

Networks
Quad band EDGE
GSM (850/900/1800/1900)
GPRS

Internet
RSS feeds
Access NetFront web browser

Memory
13 MB internal
Memory Stick Micro (M2) support (up to 8 GB )

Messaging
Email
Instant messaging (IM)
Picture messaging (MMS)
Predictive text input
Sound recorder
Text messaging (SMS)

Organizer
Alarm clock
Calculator
Calendar
Flight mode
Notes
Phone book
Stopwatch
Tasks
Timer

Special features
Pedometer
Shake control
Shortcut: enter any number from 1-999 and hold # to check SIM contacts
Shortcut: enter 0 and hold # to check call history

Battery
930 mAh Li-Pol battery
Standby time: up to 570 hours
Talk time: up to 15 hours

Included accessories
Li-Pol battery
Compact wall charger
User manual
USB cable DCU-60
Stereo headset HPM-70
Memory Stick Micro (M2) (capacity varies by wireless carrier)
Disc2Phone music management software
Charger CST-75
Multi-language warning

See also
LG Chocolate
Nokia 5610 XpressMusic
Nokia 5300
Samsung J700
Samsung E250
Samsung D900
Sony Ericsson W850
Sony Ericsson W910

References
 Sony Ericsson W580i Specification page at sonyericsson.com
 In depth review of the w580i at mobile-review.com
Sony Ericsson W580i at WikiSpecs
 Sony Ericsson's 'try the phone'
 Memory Stick supported list on sonyericsson.com

W580i
Mobile phones introduced in 2007

pt:Sony Ericsson W580